Fu-chang Chang (born April 25, 1965 in Taiwan) is an associate professor at the Graduate Institute of European Studies at Tamkang University in Taiwan.

Early life and education 
Chang was born on April 25, 1965 in Taiwan and obtained his bachelor's degree at the German Department of Soochow University, Taiwan from 1984-1988. In 1991 he graduated with a Masters by the Graduate Institute of European Studies at Tamkang University, Taiwan and subsequently served in the army from 1991-1993. In 2006 he obtained his Dr. Rer. Pol. at the University of Cologne, Germany.

Career 
Chang started his career in academics in 1988, following his Bachelors at Soochow University in Taiwan. He became a scientific assistant to  Chong-ko Tzou at Tamkang University in Taipei in 1988 and worked for Tzou until 1991. From 1993-1994 he worked at the Chengchi University in Taipei, where he assisted Mao-hsiung Hung.

Since 2006 Chang has been the Executive Secretary at the Center for European Union Studies and an assistant professor at the Graduate Institute of European Studies at Tamkang University.

Additional affiliations 
In 2008, Chang was awarded the Mercator Visiting Professorship for Political Management at the Universität Essen-Duisburg's NRW School of Governance. He gave both seminars and lectures at the university. He was also a visiting Scholar at Ludwig-Maximilians-University Munich, Germany, the Vice Secretary General of the Chinese Homeland Security Research Association, Taiwan and “Global Vision” TV Program Host in Taiwan.

Works 
Chang's publications include:

Books 

 Chang, Fu-chang: Geschichte von Schweden und Norwegen, Taipei: San-MinVerlag, 2008. (Chinese Version, in publication)
 Chang, Fu-chang: Autonomie und Allianz—EU statt NATO für die Europäische Sicherheit?, Baden-Baden: Nomos Verlag, 2008.
 Chang, Fu-chang: Auf dem Weg zur Europäischen Union, Taipei: San-Min Verlag, 2002. (289 pages, chinesische version)

References

Living people
Tamkang University alumni
Soochow University (Suzhou) alumni
Academic staff of the Ludwig Maximilian University of Munich
1965 births
Academic staff of Tamkang University